Velom Grama Panchayath  is a village in Kozhikode district in the state of Kerala, India.

The main town in this village are Palliyath, Poolakkul and kakkuni

Demographics
 India census, Velom village has population of 26738 of which 12761 are males while 13977 are females as per Population Census 2011.

In Velom village population of children with age 0-6 is 3220 which makes up 12.04 % of total population of village. Average Sex Ratio of Velom village is 1095 which is higher than Kerala state average of 1084. Child Sex Ratio for the Velom as per census is 1005, higher than Kerala average of 964.
" />
the village is situated in the bank of Gulikappuzha (Kuttiady puzha). Assembly Constituency Kuttyady and Parliament constituency is Vatakara.

Temples
 Chirakkal paradhevatha Kshethram
 Thaliyil Shiva temple
 Shankareshwaram Temple
 Umiyankunnummal Kuttichathan temple
 Putiyottil Kshethram
 Palayullaparambath Kuttichathan temple
 Alathottathil Mosque
 Choyimadam juma masjid
 Viruthikkara Juma Masjid Palliyath
 Ilavanachaal Juma Masjid
 Valakettu Juma Masjid
 Velom Arambol Juma Masjid
 Chambod Juma masjid
 Cherapuram valiya Juma masjid
 Karakkunnu Juma Masjid

Main crops
Paddy, pepper, coconut and rubber.

River's
 Gulika puzha

Transportation
Velom village connects to other parts of India through Vatakara city on the west and Kuttiady town on the east.  National highway No.66 passes through Vatakara and the northern stretch connects to Mangalore, Goa and Mumbai.  The southern stretch connects to Cochin and Trivandrum.  The eastern Highway  going through Kuttiady connects to Mananthavady, Mysore and Bangalore. The nearest airports are at Kannur and Kozhikode.  The nearest railway station is at Vatakara.

References

Villages in Kozhikode district
Vatakara area